Atlantic-Pacific Capital (APC) is an independently owned placement agent.  APC has established relationships with a network of institutional investors in North America, Europe, the Middle East, Australasia, and the emerging markets to which it markets private equity funds.

Founded in 1995, APC has raised in excess of $50 billion for over 50 transactions. APC has an established brand within the private equity community and is dedicated to maintaining relationships with over 4,000 alternative investors worldwide.

The firm is based in Greenwich, Connecticut with other offices in New York, San Francisco, Chicago, London, and Hong Kong.

History 
APC was founded in 1995 by Jim Manley who had worked as an investment banker for Prudential Securities and Merrill Lynch before founding a hedge fund advisory business, Everest Capital.  In its first ten years, the firm managed over $18 billion in fundraisings.  Among its early mandates included Pegasus Capital Advisors, Newbridge Capital, Wexford Capital and Greenwich Street Capital in the 1990s as well as New Mountain Capital, Littlejohn & Co., Wellspring Capital, Evercore Partners, Mattlin Patterson, The Jordan Company and Platinum Equity Partners in the early 2000s.

In 2005, APC launched its direct placements group forming a new team to advise fundless sponsors on placements of equity for private equity transactions.  In more recent years, APC has completed fundraisings for private equity firms including Energy Capital Partners, MPM Capital and Henderson Global Investors, among others.

Atlantic-Pacific was in a private placement lobbying group, along with C.P. Eaton, in the effort to protest a new rule opened for comment by The Securities and Exchange Commission in 2009.  The SEC proposal under the Investment Advisers Act of 1940 would prohibit an adviser from providing or agreeing to provide, directly or indirectly, payment to any third party for a solicitation of advisory business from any government entity on behalf of such adviser.  A number of leaders in private equity has written into the SEC to comment.

References

Investment banks in the United States
Companies based in Greenwich, Connecticut
Financial services companies established in 1995